General elections were held in Costa Rica on 5 February 2006. In the presidential election, Óscar Arias of the National Liberation Party (Partido Liberación Nacional), a former president and Nobel Peace Laureate, was victorious over Ottón Solís of the Citizens' Action Party (Partido Acción Ciudadana) and twelve other minor-party candidates. Although Arias was expected to win by a wide margin, the actual polling reports were unexpectedly close. However, early results showed the contest to be closer than it actually was. The preliminary official report, after 88.45% of the vote counted, showed the result for President of the Republic almost tied between Arias with 40.51% of the vote and Ottón Solís with 40.29%. Given the small difference of only 3250 votes, the Superior Electoral Tribunal announced that a manual count of all the votes would start immediately and no official winner would be announced until that process was completed, approximately two weeks after the election.

In the parliamentary election, the National Liberation Party won the mosts seats.

Presidential election

Candidates
There were fourteen candidates running for the presidency in the 2006 elections. However, only a few rose in the polls above the error margin.

Óscar Arias
Arias had been seen as the front runner throughout the campaign. Arias served as President of Costa Rica from 1986 to 1990. He is best known worldwide for his role in the signing of the Esquipulas Peace Agreement which is regarded as the crucial plan which led to the eventual end to the series of civil wars that took place throughout Central America, most notably in Nicaragua, El Salvador, and Guatemala, during the 1980s. For his role he was awarded the Nobel Peace Prize in 1987. With the monetary portion of the award he started the Arias Foundation for Peace and Human Progress, an advocacy group for demilitarization, women's rights and conflict resolution through dialogue. Through this group Arias helped to settle conflicts throughout Latin America, participating in the process to demilitarize Haiti and Panama.

Arias made the fight against poverty and corruption the headlining issues of his campaign. During public appearances he promised to provide scholarships to poor families so their children could stay in school and not have to work (a promise he fulfilled on his first day in office), and spoke about the urgency of signing the Central American Free Trade Agreement in order to create high-paying jobs for Costa Rica's youth.

With the pre-election opinion polls favoring Óscar Arias, he did not foresee such stiff competition from his closest rival Ottón Solís. At first count, there was a difference of only 0.4% (Óscar Arias = 40.6% vs Ottón Solís = 40.2%), or about 3,200 votes. Large numbers of voters supporting candidates other than Óscar Arias and Ottón Solís chose to cast their ballot for Ottón Solís at the last minute, with the objective of keeping Óscar Arias from winning the elections.

Election laws in Costa Rica dictate, among other things, that a candidate requires 40% of the votes to avoid a second round of voting for election of the President. Further, in case of a tie with candidates having the same number of votes, the elder of the two wins the seat.

Ottón Solís
Solís was the candidate of the Citizens' Action Party (PAC). Solís is a co-founder of the party and was its candidate in the 2002 presidential elections. In that election he ran against Rolando Araya of the National Liberation Party (PLN) and Abel Pacheco of the Social Christian Unity Party (PUSC). On 3 February 2002 the first round was held, in which Solís lost. He was running in an effort to break up the two-party system in Costa Rica.

Solís is a critic of the Central American Free Trade Agreement (CAFTA). He has called for the renegotiations of CAFTA to add protection for vulnerable farmers and industrial companies. He has said that in its current form, "CAFTA will increase poverty in Central America because it will displace farmers and industrial workers and will increase the cost of health care." He also said that "I never imagined CAFTA was going to be so one sided," and "The law of the jungle benefits the big beast. We are a very small beast." Solís sees several possible detrimental aspects that could come from CAFTA. First he claims that it will cause the breakup of the public telecommunications and electricity monopolies which will have to be privatized. Additionally he thinks that the lowered trade barriers will cause a flood of cheap food products from the United States to come in and this will hurt the internal market for small-scale farmers.

Otto Guevara
Otto Guevara Guth is the co-founder, along with Rigoberto Stewart and Raúl Costales Domínguez, of the Movimiento Libertario, a libertarian party. He was elected to the legislature in 1998. Guevara originally ran as a libertarian politician who claimed to believe in cutting of government programs, which he saw as excessive.   Some of these programs included government subsidies for food, US$10,000 subsidies for housing, and free textbooks paid for by the state. He also rejected government funding for the party's political campaigns.

For the 2006 election, a faction of the Movimiento Libertario led by Guevara took control of the party and backed down on many of the party's initial positions. They have decided to accept government funding, which was previously qualified by him as immoral, and on several interviews he has claimed that public education needs to be strengthened by more funding, that the country needs to build more jails, and several other issues that will actually increase government spending.

On the foreign policy front, Guevara is in favor of advancing civil liberties abroad. He is a critic of the Castro government in Cuba, accusing politicians in Latin America of being accomplices to the lack of political liberty by not speaking out against the country's government. Guevara has linked the lack of political liberties in Cuba to what he sees as an overextension of the state in Costa Rica. Specifically he sees that eliminating regulations which, according to him, affect the development of the economy, as being a part of his program to protect political liberty. Specifically he sees regulations on agroindustry as being a considerable problem.

He hasn't yet made clear if his position on these issues changed along with the others.   Given that his position on Cuba was likely the result of influence by Raúl Costales, an exiled Cuban who was one of the party founders and a long-time party secretary, and that he separated himself from the party after they voted to accept money from the government, it's likely Guevara's foreign policy has changed.

Ricardo Toledo
Toledo is the candidate for the ruling Social Christian Unity Party (PUSC) and used to be a close friend of president Abel Pacheco. He has a long history within the party as, among other things, President of the Youth of the Social Christian Unity Party, Coordinator of the party's southern districts, the head of management for the party, and senior officer and Vice-minister of the Ministry of Labor. He has also served in the legislature.

Antonio Álvarez
Antonio Álvarez is the candidate for the party that he heads, the Union for Change Party (UPC).

He is running on a platform of political change. In an interview with newspaper Al Día Álvarez said that one thing that he believes negatively affects the country is unregulated immigration of Nicaraguans. He recommends stricter penalties for employers of immigrants who might be exploiting the Nicaraguans for cheap labor, and for increased use of documentation for immigrants.

On the economic front, Álvarez is interested in helping to build infrastructure because he believes it is essential to the continued economic development of Costa Rica. He is in favor of using the grant of public work and the emergency road network plan to build up the highways. He believes that a major problem with the health system is that it is inadequately funded and that violators are not penalized. Specifically he points to businesses who are not paying in order to have enough money to fund changes to the medical system. He is not in favor of legalizing same-sex marriage but is in favor of extending the benefits of marriage over to a civil union. In order to fight corruption in the municipalities and to ensure that money reaches the level that it is supposed to, Álvarez recommends more oversight in the hiring process so that the most qualified and honest people are in the positions where money distribution is involved. He is in favor of programs which encourage entrepreneurship, especially among the younger generation. Also for college students, he is not in favor of eliminating exams for the baccalaureate, but rather wants to expand education through increased infrastructure, new programs including secondary schools, and diversifying education through the regions.

Campaign
Polemic over the Central American Free Trade Agreement was influential in the campaign as many candidates and parties took positions in support or reject of the treaty and Costa Rican society was split over the issue.

Results

President

By province

Legislative Assembly
While PLN managed to return as the main political force in the Assembly, PAC become for the first time and till this date second largest political group in the Parliament. PUSC on the other hand, affected by corruption scandals, suffered a humiliating defeat passing from be the first parliamentary party with 19 deputies to only 5. The Libertarian Movement kept its 6 seats while the newly resurrected National Union Party led by former Costa Rican Ombudsman José Manuel Echandi won one only seat for Echandi himself (who later will resign from the party, living it seatless).

Three then regional political parties won one seat each; socialist Broad Front, disable people's right party Accessibility without Exclusion and Christian party National Restoration. Broad Front's seat went for Spanish émigré José Merino and was the return of the Left in the Parliament after one period without representation. The recently founded party Unión for Change made by PLN's dissident Antonio Álvarez Desanti did not won any seat.

By province

Municipal Councils

The elections of municipal councilors of Costa Rica in 2006 were an electoral process held in parallel with the presidential and legislative elections. In them the 495 tenure aldermen and the 495 alternates that conform the 81 Municipal Councils were chosen.

The Central Canton of San José, the most populous, named 13 aldermen. Desamparados and Alajuela named 11. Others less populated (Puntarenas, Limón, Pococí, Heredia, Cartago, La Unión, San Carlos, Goicoechea, Pérez Zeledón, etc.) named 9. Others even smaller (Tibás, Grecia, Vázquez de Coronado, Montes de Oca, Siquirres, Escazú, Turrialba, etc.) appointed 7 council members. Finally, the smallest (Turrubares, San Mateo, Santa Ana, Mora, Montes de Oro, Talamanca, etc.) named 5.

References

External links
Videos of the Debate 
Arias for President 
PAC Official Website 

2006 elections in Central America
Presidential election
Elections in Costa Rica